Viktor Ivanovich Semykin is a Kazakhstani professional ice hockey coach. He is honored coach of the Republic of Kazakhstan. Semykin is currently the head coach of Buran Voronezh.

Coaching career
1983-1986 Torpedo Ust-Kamenogorsk - head coach
1986-1988 Buran Voronezh - head coach
1988-1990 Kristall Elektrostal - head coach
1990-1991 Lada Togliatti - head coach
1991-1996 Zapolyarnik Norilsk - head coach
1997-1999 HC Lipetsk - head coach
1999-2000 Amur Khabarovsk - head coach
2000-2005 Energia Kemerovo - head coach
2005-2010 HC Lipetsk - head coach
2010-2013 Buran Voronezh - head coach

References

1948 births
Living people
Sportspeople from Oskemen
Soviet ice hockey players
Kazakhstani ice hockey players
Kazzinc-Torpedo players
Kazzinc-Torpedo head coaches
Kazakhstani ice hockey coaches